Tizabad may refer to:
 Tizabad, Fars
 Tizabad, Kurdistan